Camp Blood First Slaughter is a 2014 American Direct to DVD slasher film, written and directed by Mark Polonia.

Plot
The infamous Camp Blood is open for business! A college assignment sends a group of young students deep into the woods, and deeper into terror. One by one, a masked killer begins to murder them in gruesome fashion. They say the 3rd time is the charm, and Camp Blood 3 has thrice the slice! Stay out of the woods unless you want to be the next victim of the Camp Blood killer.

Top Cast
 Kelsey Kaufmann as Christi
 Houston Baker as Barker
 Joshua Pollitt as Harvey
 Sarah Elizabeth as Sasha (as Sarah Elizabeth)
 Ashley Wray as Marcy
 Cindy Wheeler as Professor Mallory
 Steve Diasparra as The Figure/ The Mayor
 Kan Vansant as Sheriff (as Ken Vansant)
 Jeff Kirkendall as Fletcher
 Elizabeth Costanzo as Brianna (as Elizabeth Costanzo)

Reception

DVD Review said "The best compliment that I can give the film is that Mark Polonia and his team tried to do the best that they could with the given budget and resources. They clearly love the genre and set out to try and do something that was in the B-movie realm and in the “so bad that it’s good” category. Needless to say, they failed spectacularly".

References

External links
 
 

2014 films
2014 horror films
American slasher films
American independent films
Direct-to-video horror films
American serial killer films
Horror films about clowns
Camp Blood (film series)
2010s slasher films
2010s serial killer films
2014 independent films
Films directed by Mark Polonia
2010s American films